Rubess is a surname. Notable people with the surname include:

 Baņuta Rubess (born 1956), Canadian playwright, director, and theatre professor
 Bruno Rubess (1926–2009), Latvian businessman

See also
 Rubes (surname)